Esmeralda was a 44-gun frigate built in Port Mahón, Balearic Islands in 1791 for the Spanish Navy. The First Chilean Navy Squadron, under the command of Thomas Cochrane, captured her on the night of 5 November 1820. She was renamed Valdivia in Chilean service. She was beached at Valparaíso in June 1825.

Spanish career
The ship was 950 tons burthen frigate designed by engineer Bouyón in the Balearic Islands. 
After the defeat in the Battle of Chacabuco the Spanish government ordered Esmeralda to sail from Cádiz on 6 May 1817 under the command of Captain Luis Goic with a convoy that included the ships Reina de los Ángeles, San José, San Juan, Castilla, Tagle, and Primorosa Mariana. The convoy arrived in Callao on 30 September 1817; Tagle had already arrived on 21 August.

On 31 March 1818 Esmeralda, the most powerful Spanish warship on the Pacific coast, joined Pezuela and Potrillo in the blockade of Valparaíso. On 27 April,  came alongside Esmeralda, but she made such poor contact that fewer than 20 men from Lautaro were able to get on board Esmeralda. Although the boarders were unable to capture Esmeralda, the Spanish ships abandoned the blockade.

Chilean career

On the night of 5 November 1820, during the Expedition to Freeing of Perú, two silent columns of boats under command of Thomas Cochrane, 10th Earl of Dundonald entered Callao Bay and captured Esmeralda under the guns of Callao's fortifications. The demoralization of his crews helped dissipate the naval power of the Viceroy. Later, she was renamed Valdivia to commemorate Cochrane's capture of Valdivia.

The squadron was forced to move up and down the coast on supply gathering excursions, challenging shore fortifications.

As the intensity of the quarreling between San Martín and Cochrane increased, Cochrane sailed north with O'Higgins, Independencia and Valdivia in search of the last two Spanish frigates in the Pacific: Venganza and Prueba. The Chilean ships sailed as far as the Gulf of Cortez off Mexico without finding a trace of the missing frigates.

Loss
On 10 June 1825 at Valparaiso, a gale from the north developed. The gale drove Esmaralda and the Chilean merchantman Valparaiso on shore. As Valparaiso was blown towards shore, her anchor hooked and broke the chains of the brig , with the result that Calder too wrecked on shore.

Post-script
Valdivias keel became fixed in the sand. The ship was unsalvageable and was filled with sand so that she could be used as Valparaíso's first pier for passengers and light cargo. The area where she rested was later filled in with rubble, burying her. The area is now Plaza Sotomayor.

Citations and references
Citations

References
Bateson, Charles, and Jack Kenneth Loney (1972) Australian Shipwrecks: 1622-1850.  (A. H. & A. W. Reed).
Gaspar Pérez Turrado (1996) Las Marinas realista y Patriota en la independencia de Chile y Perú. (Ministerio de Defensa, Madrid, España). 

First Chilean Navy Squadron
1791 ships
Captured ships
Frigates of the Spanish Navy
Sailing frigates of the Chilean Navy
Maritime incidents in 1825
Ships built in Spain